is a 2016 Japanese animated drama film produced by Kyoto Animation, directed by Naoko Yamada and written by Reiko Yoshida, featuring character designs by Futoshi Nishiya and music by Kensuke Ushio. It is based on the manga of the same name written and illustrated by Yoshitoki Ōima. Plans for an animated film adaptation were announced back in November 2014, Kyoto Animation was confirmed to produce the film in November 2015. Miyu Irino and Saori Hayami signed on as voice casting in May 2016 and the theatrical release poster and official trailer were released in July 2016.

The film covers elements of coming of age and psychological drama, dealing with themes of bullying, disability, forgiveness, mental health, suicide, and friendship of opposite sexes. It follows the story of a former bully turned social outcast, who decides to reconnect and befriend the deaf girl he had bullied years prior.

The film premiered at Tokyo on August 24, 2016. It was released in Japan on September 17, 2016, and worldwide between February and June 2017. The film received highly positive reviews from critics, with praise going to the direction, animation, and the psychological complexity of the characters. It has grossed over $31.6 million worldwide. The film won the Japanese Movie Critics Awards for Best Animated Feature Film. While nominated for the Japan Academy Film Prize for Excellent Animation of the Year, as well the Mainichi Film Award for Best Animation Film, it lost to In This Corner of the World and Your Name, respectively.

Plot

Deaf elementary school student Shōko Nishimiya joins a new school, where she becomes the target of bullying by fellow student Shōya Ishida and his friends. When word of the bullying reaches the principal, Shōya is framed as the sole perpetrator. Blaming Shōko for getting him into trouble, Shōya gets into a physical altercation with her. Shōko subsequently transfers to another school, and Shōya keeps a notebook she had left behind.

Outcast for his reputation as a bully, Shōya becomes a depressed loner. Now in high school, Shōya intends to kill himself, but decides at the last minute to make amends with those he has wronged before doing so. Shōya goes to return Shōko's notebook at the sign language center and reconcile with her, which she accepts. Tomohiro Nagatsuka, another loner, also befriends Shōya after Shōya protects him from a bully.

One day, Shōya accidentally drops the notebook into a river and jumps in to retrieve it against the law. Shōko's younger sister Yuzuru vengefully takes a photo of the incident and posts it online, resulting in Shōya getting suspended. When Yuzuru runs away from home, Shōya offers to let her stay at his house, and the two reconcile.

Shōya and Shōko reunite with Miyoko Sahara, a classmate from elementary school who was friendly to Shōko. Shōko later gives Shōya a gift and confesses her feelings for him, but because she tries to speak rather than signing, Shōya mishears her.

Shōya invites Shōko to an amusement park with Tomohiro, Miyoko, Miki Kawai (another classmate from elementary school), and Satoshi Mashiba (Miki's friend). They are joined by another classmate from elementary school, Naoka Ueno, who had also bullied Shōko. Naoka voices her resentment towards Shōko for creating a rift between her and Shōya, with whom she is infatuated. Yuzuru secretly records the encounter and shows it to Shōya. Desperate to remain blameless for her part in bullying Shōko, Miki exposes Shōya's past to the students, later attempting to apologize to the group when this doesn’t work.

After Shōko and Yuzuru's grandmother passes away, Shōya takes them to the countryside to cheer them up, where he realizes that Shōko blames herself for everything that has happened to him. Shōya decides to devote his entire social life to the sisters.

During a fireworks festival, Shōko leaves early, ostensibly to finish her homework. Shōya follows her and finds her preparing to jump from her balcony. Shōya manages to stop her, but falls into the river below in doing so. He is rescued by his friends, but is rendered comatose.

One night, Shōko dreams about receiving a farewell visit from Shōya. Shōya awakens from his coma and makes his way to the bridge, where he finds Shōko weeping. He apologizes for how he treated her and tells her not to blame herself for the way his life has turned out. He also reveals his original plan to commit suicide, but confesses that he has decided against it and asks Syoko to help him keep living, to which she agrees.

When Shōya returns to school, he reunites with his friends and realizes how much they still care for him. As they all go to the school festival together, Shōya tears up, realizing he has finally redeemed himself.

Characters

A high school boy who bullied Shōko Nishimiya, a deaf girl, in elementary school. He becomes the victim of bullying when the principal finds out. Now a social outcast, he strives to make amends with Shōko.

A deaf girl who transferred to Shōya's elementary school where she was the victim of constant harassment by Shōya and his friends, forcing her to transfer again.

Shōko's younger sister who was initially opposed to Shōya being around Shōko. She will then grow closer to Shōya as he tries his best to make amends with Shōko.

A rotund high school boy who is best friends with Shōya.

Shōya's elementary school classmate who joined him in bullying Shōko.

One of the few classmates in Shōko's elementary school who was friendly to Shōko.

A classmate of Shōya's from elementary to high school.

Miki's friend and love interest, a high school boy who befriended Shōya.

Shōya's elementary school friend and accomplice in bullying Shōko. Kazuki later starts to bully Shōya.

One of Shōya's friends in elementary school who later starts to bully him.

Shōya's elementary school teacher.

Shōya's mother.

Shōko and Yuzuru's mother who disapproves of her daughters being around Shōya.

Maria's mother and Pedro's wife.

Shōya's niece and the daughter of his older sister and Pedro.

Shōko and Yuzuru's grandmother and Yaeko's mother.

Maria's father, the husband of Shōya's older sister and Shōya's brother-in-law.

Production
The anime adaptation of the manga was announced in the manga's final chapter that released on November 19, 2014, later specifying that the adaptation will be an anime theatrical film on December 17, 2014. In the Weekly Shōnen Magazine 46th issue of 2015 that released on October 14, 2015, Kyoto Animation and Naoko Yamada were announced to be the animation studio and director of the film adaptation, respectively. The film's distributor, Warner Bros. Pictures, listed the adaptation releasing in Q4 2016. On April 8, 2016, the film adaptation's official website opened, announcing that Reiko Yoshida would write the script for the film, Futoshi Nishiya would design the characters and the film was scheduled for release in Japanese theaters on September 17, 2016. Kensuke Ushio and Pony Canyon composed and produced the music, respectively. The film's theme song, titled Koi wo Shita no wa (恋をしたのは), was performed by Aiko, while "My Generation" by The Who was used during the opening credit.

For the English dub, deaf actress Lexi Cowden was cast as Shōko.

Analysis

Themes 
The cinematic adaptation, based on the manga of the same name by Yoshitoki Ōima, covers a large part of the original plot. Some segments have been shortened for runtime reasons. Individual scenes were weighted differently so that the manga can be considered supplementary literature, for example, of the characters' backgrounds.

The more obvious themes covered by the film are school bullying and the integration of disabled people in society. The film then tackles with handling guilt within a community (although this aspect is exposed more in-depth in the manga), redemption for mistakes of the past, forgiveness and self-respect. Director Naoko Yamada explains that bullying should not be considered as the central theme of the film but rather a means to explore Shōya's personality as he gets older. The course of bullying is presented precisely and intuitively, in rapid sequences. It is depicted as a collective failure, starting from school managers and overwhelmed teachers to the class community itself.

The film, lastly, deals with the theme of suicide. Yamada said she was "determined to confront the topic with integrity and treat it gracefully", stressing that it "is by any means not the right decision".

Stylistic means 
The narration of Shōya's story, starting from his past to present, describes how he slips to the lower end of the hierarchy that he established at the beginning. From his perspective, it is shown how bullying can affect an adolescent's psyche and prove his resilience. Shōya faces many challenges: the rejection of Shōko's mother or the avoidance of former classmates, who don't want to confront their past behaviour when he and Shōko work through their past.

Shōya's alienation and inability to look at his fellow people are symbolised by crosses (✖️) on their faces. This behaviour is often emphasised by camera framing, which avoids the faces of people around him as Shōya shies away from eye contact, often focusing on body language instead. In some face-to-face conversations, Shōya's interlocutor's face is cut out of the frame; the empty space left behind him achieves an unsettling effect for the viewer.

Symbolism 
The film relies on subtle and sensuous motifs. Yamada uses flower language to reflect feelings and personality of the characters. Shōko is juxtaposed with white daisies, symbolising purity, and blue or red cyclamen, which can represent resignation, leave-taking, but also deep affection. Cherry blossoms often enclose Shōko and Shōya: they appear when the two first reconcile and when Shōya befriends Tomohiro Nagatsuka.

The koi, a symbol of luck and perseverance in Japan, represent Shōya, Shōko, and the rest of the group overcoming their shortcomings and rebuilding their lives. Fireworks are a metaphor of the transience of each single moment of life: both scenes with the fireworks anticipate the suicide attempts of the two protagonists, reminding them of their hopelessness towards life.

The film occasionally shows short dream sequences. The architecture seen in the background describes the protagonists' inner life, recalling Michelangelo Antonioni's work. In other scenes, the lack of harmony of the characters is depicted by oversized pictures in the room. The characters are stylized, recalling the caricatural style of My Neighbors the Yamadas.

Music 

"My Generation" by The Who is used at the beginning of the film to express teenage rebellion and angst. The song rides the excitement and amusement of the kids gathering before school, ending with Shōko's entrance into the classroom. Yamada said that, for this scene, she wanted to use an evergreen that everyone could identify.

Composer Kensuke Ushio, recognizing the central role of sound in the film, gave importance to musical and non-musical elements, including silence. The song "lvs", played when Shōko is excluded from the class community, was recorded by putting a microphone inside a piano, obtaining a muffled sound in which the piano mechanics' noises are emphasized. This technique recreates for the viewer an effect that resembles Shōko's perception.

Release 
The film premiered in 120 theaters across Japan on September 17, 2016. It was screened at the 2016 Scotland Loves Animation festival on October 22, 2016, and at the ICA in London on February 5, 2017. Anime Limited distributed and released the film in the United Kingdom and Ireland on March 15, 2017. Purple Plan released the film in Singapore and Malaysia on March 9, 2017. Madman Entertainment released the film for a limited duration in Australia and New Zealand from April 9, 2017, and April 16, 2017, respectively. Viz Media Europe acquired the film for distribution in Europe (excluding the UK and Ireland), Russia, Turkey, and French-speaking Africa in 2017. In 2017, Konnichiwa Festival released the movie in theaters in Mexico, Brazil, Chile, Colombia, Costa Rica, El Salvador, Guatemala, Honduras, Panama, and Peru for a limited time in May, while in countries like Argentina and Uruguay, Anifest had a theatrical release in June. Pioneer Films released the movie in the Philippines on May 10, 2017. Eleven Arts screened the film at Anime Expo on July 3, 2017, with a limited theatrical release in the U.S. on October 20, 2017, and a second screening in January 2019.

Home video 
Pony Canyon released the film in Japan on May 17, 2017, on standard edition DVD, standard edition Blu-ray, and a limited edition Blu-ray. The limited edition Blu-ray contains two animated videos of the film's theme song and "Speed of Youth", one of the original soundtracks by composer Kensuke Ushio. In the United Kingdom and Ireland, Anime Limited released the film on standard edition DVD and Blu-ray, and a collector's edition combo set on October 30, 2017. Madman Entertainment released the film on standard edition DVD and Blu-ray, and a limited edition combo set on December 6, 2017. Shout! Factory released the film on a standard edition DVD and Blu-ray combo set in North America on April 2, 2019, and Right Stuf released the film on a limited edition combo set on November 26, 2019.

Streaming 
Madman Entertainment streamed the film on AnimeLab for limited durations between February 14, 2018, to February 20, 2018, and June 1, 2020, to June 30, 2020. Netflix released the film on the website from June 5, 2019, to February 15, 2022.

Television broadcast
In Japan, the film received a terrestrial television premiere on August 25, 2018, at 9:00 PM through NHK Educational TV and it received an audience rating of 2.5%, according to the video statistics. It was aired on July 31, 2020, at 9:00 PM through Nippon TV's Friday Night Roadshow amid the COVID-19 pandemic in Japan, along with Akiyuki Shinbo and Nobuyuki Takeuchi's Fireworks.

Reception

Box office 
It ranked at #16 on Nikkei Hit Ranking for 2016 from East division.

In China, the film grossed .

Critical response 
Makoto Shinkai, director of Your Name, called the film a "fantastic piece of work" and a "polished and grand production" which even he is unable to replicate. It won Best Animation of the Year in the 26th Japan Movie Critics Awards, where director Naoko Yamada also received praise for her work on the film. At the 2017 Annecy International Animated Film Festival, the film was selected as one of the nine feature films in competition.

On review aggregator website Rotten Tomatoes, the film has an approval rating of 95% based on 37 reviews, and an average rating of 7.61/10. The website's critical consensus reads, "As beautifully crafted as it is powerfully written, A Silent Voice looks at teen bullying from a soberingly hard-hitting perspective that's uncommon for the animated medium." On Metacritic, the film has a weighted average score of 78 out of 100, based on 10 critics, indicating "generally favorable reviews".

Accolades

See also 
 List of films featuring the deaf and hard of hearing

References

External links 
  
 
 
 

2016 films
2016 anime films
2016 drama films
2010s high school films
2010s psychological drama films
2010s teen drama films
Animated drama films
Animated films about friendship
Animated films based on children's books
Animated teen films
Anime films based on manga
Drama anime and manga
Films about atonement
Films about deaf people
Films about school bullying
Films about suicide
Films directed by Naoko Yamada
Films set in the 2000s
Films set in the 2010s
Films set in 2004
Films set in 2007
Films set in 2010
Films set in 2011
Films set in Gifu Prefecture
Japanese animated films
Japanese high school films
2010s Japanese-language films
Japanese Sign Language films
Japanese psychological drama films
Japanese teen drama films
Kyoto Animation
Middle school films
Midlife crisis films
Psychological drama films
Psychological anime and manga
Shochiku films